Amos Slaymaker (March 11, 1755June 21, 1837) was a member of the U.S. House of Representatives from Pennsylvania. His younger sister, Faithful, was the mother of the nineteenth-century Presbyterian minister George Duffield.

Biography
Amos Slaymaker was born at London Lands in Lancaster County in the Province of Pennsylvania. He built and operated a hotel on the Philadelphia and Lancaster Turnpike.

During the Revolutionary War, he served as an ensign in the company of Captain John Slaymaker. He was a member of an association formed for the suppression of Tory activities in Lancaster County, Pennsylvania.

A justice of the peace of Salisbury Township, Pennsylvania and county commissioner from 1806 to 1810, he then served in the Pennsylvania State Senate in 1810 and 1811.

Slaymaker was elected as a Federalist to the Thirteenth Congress to fill the vacancy caused by the resignation of James Whitehill.

Death and interment
Slaymaker died in Salisbury on June 21, 1837, and was interred in the Leacock Presbyterian Cemetery in Paradise.

References

External links

FamilySearch: 1VGK-M29 (Amos Slaymaker)

1755 births
1837 deaths
Pennsylvania state senators
Continental Army soldiers
Federalist Party members of the United States House of Representatives from Pennsylvania